is the pen name of , a well-known Japanese novelist. He is known for writing Yakuza crime novels. His pen name is based on the Chinese name of Hong Kong filmmaker Stephen Chow, Chow Sing-chi (周星馳), written backwards and rendered in Japanese.

He was born in Hokkaido, Japan and graduated from Yokohama City University with his B.A. in 1987.

A few of his novels were adapted into Asian films, such as The City of Lost Souls and Sleepless Town, in 2000 and 1998, respectively.

Hase supervised the story for Sega's 2005 video game Yakuza and its 2006 sequel Yakuza 2. He had no involvement with later entries in the series.

In 2020, Hase won the Naoki Prize with his novel “Shonen to Inu” (“A Boy and Dog”).

References

External links 
 

1965 births
20th-century Japanese novelists
21st-century Japanese novelists
Japanese crime fiction writers
Mystery Writers of Japan Award winners
Yokohama City University alumni
Living people
Naoki Prize winners
Writers from Hokkaido